Darreh-ye Gavmish or Darreh Gavmish may refer to:
 Darreh Gavmish, Chaharmahal and Bakhtiari